Censorship of Google may refer to:
 blocking or filtering of Google services or websites by outside entities, notably in the policies of Internet censorship in China
 Censorship by Google as the result of legal action by third parties, most notably the European Union's "right to be forgotten"

See also
 Internet censorship and surveillance by country